Dhosth may refer to:

 Dhosth (2001 Malayalam film), a film starring Dileep and Kunchacko Boban
 Dosth (2001 Tamil film), a film starring R. Sarathkumar